Ernst Biel (born 18 June 1934) is an Austrian speed skater. He competed in two events at the 1956 Winter Olympics.

References

1934 births
Living people
Austrian male speed skaters
Olympic speed skaters of Austria
Speed skaters at the 1956 Winter Olympics
Place of birth missing (living people)